Will Montgomery (born 2 February 2000) is an English rugby union player who plays for Newcastle Falcons in the Premiership Rugby.

References

External links
Newcastle Falcons Profile
ESPN Profile
Ultimate Rugby Profile

2000 births
Living people
English rugby union players
Newcastle Falcons players
Rugby union players from Surrey
Rugby union locks